While the City Sleeps is a 1928 American silent crime drama film about a tough New York City police detective, played by Lon Chaney, out to catch a murdering gangster. The film was directed by Jack Conway, written by Andrew Percival Younger, and co-starred Anita Page, Carroll Nye, Wheeler Oakman, and Mae Busch.

The sets were designed by Cedric Gibbons. Sam and Jack Feinberg (Chaney's set musicians) also played uncredited roles in the film; they can be seen playing in the band at Skeeter's nightclub, and also in the street scene where Mae Busch's body is found dead in her car. The movie was filmed on location in Los Angeles, and Lt. Roy Harlacher of the LAPD served as Chaney's technical advisor.

The film was originally supposed to be called either Chinatown or Easy Money. The film was in production from April 12, 1928 to May 18, 1928, and cost $259,000 to produce. The worldwide box office gross was $1,035,000. A still exists showing Chaney in the role of Detective Dan Coghlan.

Plot
The film focuses on the 'Plain Clothes Men', a group of detectives dressed up as average citizens to catch criminals without being noticed. They are especially hated by the underworld due to their constant meeting, during which suspects are analyzed and interrogated extensively. Among the staff is Dan Coghlan (Lon Chaney), a police officer with flat feet and a tough disposition, who is unsatisfied with the lack of adventure. As he is about to quit his job, he is noticed about a croaked jeweler. When arriving there, he finds "Mile-Away" Skeeter Carlson (Wheeler Oakman), a crook who never gets busted for the crimes he commits due to a lack of evidence. (He always claims he was "a mile away" from the crime scene.)

Dan decides to follow him, and after talking to Skeeter's low-life girlfriend Bessie (Mae Busch) without gaining any information, he prevents Skeeter from seducing young Myrtle Sullivan (Anita Page), an innocent flapper who finds excitement in hanging out with crooks. Dan has assigned himself as Myrtle's care-taker, and he disapproves of her boyfriend Marty (Carroll Nye), a dapper gangster without a job. When Skeeter is out of town for two days, Dan grasps this opportunity to manipulate Bessie. After convincing her that Skeeter is planning to dump her for Myrtle, Bessie rats on Skeeter and admits that he murdered the jeweler.

Without wasting any time, Dan sets out to bust Skeeter and his gang, only to find out that one of them is Marty. Shortly after, Bessie's dead body is found in her car, and Dan is convinced that Skeeter is responsible for her death, considering that she was going to testify against him. The case against Skeeter is dismissed by the court, and he immediately reveals his plan to murder Marty. Dan overhears this conversation, and hurries to protect Marty only to catch him in the midst of a fur warehouse robbery. Even though he could turn him in, Dan orders the police to leave Marty alone and helps the young man to go straight, provided that Marty leave town.

Before leaving town, Marty wants to meet Myrtle one last time and sends her a letter, but Skeeter reads it before she can receive it. He tries to force himself on her, but he is interrupted by a police raid. Before they open the door, Skeeter fires a shot right through it - which kills a cop - and then gets away. Upon finding out that Myrtle will testify against him, Skeeter sets out to kill her. Meanwhile, Dan tells Myrtle against his better judgment that he loves her and then proposes marriage to her. Even though she is actually in love with Marty, Myrtle accepts, really just out of gratitude for all that Dan has done for her.

Afterwards, Dan leaves to find Skeeter, and catches him and his men preparing for a get-away. It results in a climactic shootout, during which several policemen and gangsters are killed. Skeeter's men give up after being attacked by tear gas bombs, but Skeeter finds a way to escape onto the rooftop. Dan follows him there, and after yet another shootout, Skeeter is killed. Meanwhile, Marty returns to town in a rage after finding out about Dan and Myrtle's engagement. Marty proposes to Myrtle, but she decides to stay loyal to Dan. Dan realizes that she really loves Marty, and arranges for them to get hitched. Dan tells Marty "You go marry that girl, but if you ever make her unhappy, I'll break your neck!"

Cast
 Lon Chaney as Daniel Aloysius 'Dan' Coghlan
 Anita Page as Myrtle Sullivan
 Carroll Nye as Marty
 Wheeler Oakman as 'Mile-Away' Skeeter Carlson
 Mae Busch as Bessie
 Polly Moran as Mrs. McGinnis
 Lydia Yeamans Titus as Mrs. Sullivan
 William Orlamond as Dwiggins
 Richard Carle as Wally
 Eddie Sturgis as Skeeter's Driver
 Clinton Lyle as Member of Criminal Gang
 Sydney Bracey as the cook
 Joseph W. Girard as Captain of Detectives
 Fred Kelsey as Detective in Shadow Box
 William H. O'Brien as Tenant
 L.J. O'Connor as Cop in Hall
 Angelo Rossito
 Eddie Kane
 Buddy Rae
 Scott Seaton as the D.A.

Production
Chaney personally chose Anita Page as the leading lady, after seeing the rushes for Our Dancing Daughters (1928), in which she co-starred. By that time, Page was preparing for Bellamy Trial (1929), but she was reassigned to appear in While the City Sleeps. About working with Chaney, Page stated in a 2007 interview:
"Before filming began, Lon talked to me about make-up and explained the action scenes to me. Finally, he gave me one last bit of advice: ‘Never act purely on impulse in important matters,’ he said. ‘Think things over carefully. Then, when you’re sure that you’re right, go ahead. And don’t let anything swerve you from that decision.’"

Los Angeles City Hall, which opened in April 1928, appears on film for perhaps the first time in the background of a few rooftop scenes, especially in the climactic rooftop gun battle.

Critical Comments
"Now and then Lon Chaney tosses his make-up kit over the fence and acts like a human being. He appears "as is" in this picture, which shows crook stuff at its highest tempo, dwarfing THE BIG CITY to the size of a newsreel, and proving that an occasional straight role is fine balance for big character actors. He gives a remarkable characterization of a tough dick. A well-knit story, exceptionally cast and directed." ---Photoplay

"I may have mentioned in this space that I have always considered TELL IT TO THE MARINES Lon Chaney's best picture. This for the reason that in it Chaney didn't make up. Whether I've mentioned it or not, the opinion is now revised. I consider WHILE THE CITY SLEEPS Chaney's best picture. After all, he did have a marine uniform in the other picture. In this he works straight as to attire as well as character. He's a detective, a big city detective, and I think it's well nigh time somebody did a detective without making him funny. Chaney does so." ---Exhibitors Herald

"To begin with, Lon Chaney doesn't do at all in a semi-heroic role. You can't disassociate him from something monstrous and all the bizarre characters he has ever played come up to confront the spectator. Good judgement ought to have barred Chaney from the role in the first place. Therefore, a misplaced star turns what might have been a stirring meller into second grade quality program output, wholly dependent on Chaney's name." ---Variety

"Though this is an underworld drama, the theme is exactly the same as that of Laugh, Clown, Laugh. And Lon Chaney is again the somewhat dilapidated looking would-be lover who laughs while his heart is breaking. Very exciting but I think Lon Chaney should pick on girls nearer his own age." ---Motion Picture Magazine

Tag Lines
"You've seen Chaney as a crook Now you see him as a master detective in one of his most exciting performances!" --- (Print Ad-Provo Sunday Herald, ((Provo, Utah)) 11/11/28)

"CHANEY, as a detective, single-handed, corners the city's most dangerous "mob" in their hide-away- and then finds he has bitten off more than he can chew!" --- (Print Ad- Dodge City Daily Globe, ((Dodge City, Ks.)) 21 January 1929)

"Detectives, the underworld, thrills and a glorious romance. The real inside story of how New York plain clothes men battle the forces of crime day and night." --- (Print Ad- Watkins Express, ((Watkins Glen, NY)) 13 December 1928)

Survival status
The film was released silent, but was also released in some areas equipped with sound effects and a musical score. All of the extant prints of While the City Sleeps are missing portions from reels 6 and 7, and nitrate decomposition has affected some portions of the surviving reels. but this does not significantly affect the storyline. The partial sound prints no longer exist.

References

External links

 
 
 
 
 Lobby card
 Still at silenthollywood.com

1928 films
American silent feature films
American black-and-white films
Films directed by Jack Conway
American police detective films
Fictional portrayals of the New York City Police Department
Films about the New York City Police Department
Films set in New York City
American gangster films
Metro-Goldwyn-Mayer films
American crime drama films
1928 crime drama films
Flappers
1920s American films
Silent American drama films
Silent mystery films
Silent thriller films